Lincoln (2011 pop.: 6,458) is a Canadian suburban community in Sunbury County, New Brunswick.

Geography
Located on the west bank of the Saint John River between Fredericton and Oromocto, Lincoln was one of the original United Empire Loyalist settlements established in the province following the American Revolution.

History

Lincoln was one of the original United Empire Loyalist settlements established in the province following the American Revolution.

When the Loyalists moved from the newly independent colonies to British North America, Captain Benjamin Glazier moved in March 1776 to this area and named it Lincoln, as that is where he came from in Massachusetts.  Then Upper and Lower Lincoln were created. Then on 18 May 1785 was proclaimed as the Official Birthday of Lincoln. The latter, Upper Lincoln became part of the City of Fredericton, but Lower Lincoln is now only Lincoln and is a Local Service District. A Local Service District (L.S.D.), elects an Advisory committee and advises the Min of Municipal Affairs of what the Citizens would like to have as far as Bylaws and Codes are concerned. As Lincoln has a big Tax Base, due to the Airport, etc.

Although Lincoln is in between the City of Fredericton and the Town of Oromocto, it is easily accessible via the Trans Canada Highway, which forms the boundary on the south. For years Lincoln was just a small 1 street community, but in the 1950s Nevers road was upgraded from a dirt road, and houses started to appear.

Notable people

See also
List of communities in New Brunswick

References

Communities in Sunbury County, New Brunswick
Designated places in New Brunswick